Anna Pump (born Anna Heitweg Tuitjer; April 11, 1934 – October 5, 2015) was a German-born American chef, cookbook author, baker, and innkeeper best known for her bakery and gourmet takeout shop in The Hamptons, Loaves & Fishes.  She was the author of four cookbooks and the owner of the Bridgehampton Inn.  Pump was a mentor to Ina Garten, of Food Network, who wrote the foreword to Pump's final cookbook Summer on a Plate.  She was sometimes a guest on Garten's Barefoot Contessa.

Pump was born on a farm in Tarp, Germany. She moved to the US with her husband, Detlef Pump and both children, Harm and Sybille in 1960, where they lived in Frenchtown, New Jersey, before moving to the Hamptons more than a decade later.

A resident of Sag Harbor, New York, Pump died in Bridgehampton on October 5, 2015, at age 81, when she was struck by a pickup truck that failed to yield at a crossing.

Bibliography
The Loaves and Fishes Cookbook (1987)   	
The Loaves and Fishes Party Cookbook (1990)
Country Weekend Entertaining (1999)
Summer on a Plate (2008)

References  

1934 births
2015 deaths
20th-century American non-fiction writers
20th-century American women writers
21st-century American non-fiction writers
21st-century American women writers
American bakers
American chefs
American food writers
American women non-fiction writers
German emigrants to the United States
People from Frenchtown, New Jersey
People from Sag Harbor, New York
People from Schleswig-Flensburg
Road incident deaths in New York (state)
Pedestrian road incident deaths